Pacaás Novos National Park  is a national park in the state of Rondônia, Brazil. 
The park contains a mountain range by the same name.

Location

The park is in the Amazon biome.
It was established by decree 84.019 of 21 September 1979, and is administered by the Chico Mendes Institute for Biodiversity Conservation.
The park covers parts of the municipalities of Alvorada d'Oeste, Campo Novo de Rondônia, Governador Jorge Teixeira, Guajará-Mirim, Mirante da Serra and Nova Mamoré in the state of Rondônia.

The park takes its name from the Pacaás Novos River, which rises in the Pacaás Novos mountains in the west of the park and flows southwest via the Rio Pacaás Novos Extractive Reserve to join the Mamoré River just south of Guajará-Mirim.
To the west the park adjoins the Guajará-Mirim State Park.

Annual rainfall averages .

Conservation

The park is classed as IUCN protected area category II (national park).
The objectives are to preserve a representative sample of the transition between the Cerrado and the Amazon rainforest, to protect about 2,000 springs of three major river basins, to contribute to the  integrity of the Rondonia Center Mosaic, to protect species of fauna and flora and endangered plant species endemic to the family Podocarpaceae, and to preserve the scenic beauty of the region.
The park would be included in the proposed Western Amazon Ecological Corridor.
Protected species in the park include the black-shouldered opossum (Caluromysiops irrupta).

References

Sources

1979 establishments in Brazil
National parks of Brazil
Highest points of Brazilian states
Protected areas of Rondônia